State Road 41 (SR 41) is the secret designation for U.S. Route 301 between Temple Terrace and Zephyrhills, Florida. It is known as Fort King Highway in Hillsborough County, and Fort King Road in Pasco County.

Route description

State Road 41 begins at Harney Road (County Road 580/43) at the embankment of a former railroad overpass, and curves underneath Interstate 75 with no access. It serves as the eastern terminus for State Road 582, as well as the unmarked County Road 582 in Thonotosassa. The road continues northeastward rejoining the aforementioned abandoned railroad line as both run through Hillsborough River State Park. Like much of US 301 between Bushnell and Bradenton, State Road 41 also runs parallel to the DeSoto Trail.

Entering Pasco County, the road changes its name from Fort King Highway to Fort King Road. In Zephyrhills, it becomes concurrent with State Road 39 which eventually replaces it as the secret route of US 301.

Former sections

County Road 41

In Zephyrhills, Route 41 breaks away as a County Road that was originally a state road. From this point to the intersection with Daughtery Road, it runs along the west side of a former Seaboard Air Line Railroad line which was abandoned in the early-1970's. Between Zephyrhills and Dade City, the road is known mainly as Fort King Road. After crossing County Road 52 Alternate, it runs towards the back of Pasco High School. Within the Dade City Limits, it becomes South 17th Street. Concurrent with SR 52 between South 17th Street and North 21st Street, and then immediately with County Road 578 between Saint Joe Road and Lock Street.

Northwest of Dade City CR 41 becomes Blanton Road, where it winds up, down, and around more hills. It serves as the terminus of both ends of County Road 41 Alternate one end of which also includes the terminus of County Road 575. At the interchange with Interstate 75 at Exit 293 (formerly Exit 60) it becomes a two-lane divided highway, but only in the vicinity of the ramps. In between, it narrows back down to a two-lane bridge over I-75 itself. CR 41 curves back north again near an orange grove at the intersection of County Road 577 (Lake Iola Road), where it enters Hernando County.

County Road 541

North of the Hernando County Line, County Road 41 becomes County Road 541 as Spring Lake Highway. Once a former segment of State Road 41 and later County Road 41, it continues to move up and down the hills of eastern Hernando County, through orange groves, former orange groves, and hay farms. The road serves as the eastern terminus of CR 576 (Hayman Road, formerly CR 420) and CR 572 (Powell Road) in Spring Lake. North of CR 572, one major orange grove remains intact. It ends at US 98/SR 50 in Hill 'n Dale, where it leads to a realigned section of County Road 484.

Major intersections

Related route

County Road 41 Alternate is the bannered route of CR 41 in the northwestern outskirts of Dade City. It was originally a suffixed alternate of State Road 35 called County Road 35B, and included Frazee Hill Road.

References

External links
Florida Route Log (SR 41)

041
041
041
041